Metacoleroa is a genus of fungi in the family Venturiaceae. A monotypic genus, it contains the single species Metacoleroa dickiei .

References

External links
Metacoleroa at Index Fungorum

Venturiaceae
Monotypic Dothideomycetes genera